Jammed is the sixteenth album by the Australian alternative rock band The Church, released in August 2004. It was their second album of entirely improvised material, following the Bastard Universe bonus disc from Hologram of Baal (September 1998) and consists of only two extremely long tracks. It was only available from the band's website or at their gigs.

Track listing
All tracks by Kilbey/Koppes/Powles/Willson-Piper
"The Sexual Act" - 38:44 (instrumental)
"Interlock" - 20:00 (instrumental)

Personnel 

Steve Kilbey – bass guitar
Peter Koppes – guitar
Tim Powles – drums, percussion
Marty Willson-Piper – guitar

References 

2004 albums
The Church (band) albums